Hajjiabad-e Muzi (also Romanized as Ḩājjīābād-e Mūzī; also known as Ḩājjīābād) is a village in Shapur Rural District, in the Central District of Kazerun County, Fars Province, Iran. At the 2006 census, its population was 436, in 102 families.

References 

Populated places in Kazerun County